Novenkoye is a rural locality (a selo) and the administrative center of Novonensky Selsoviet of Loktevsky District, Altai Krai, Russia. The population was 412 as of 2016. There are  10 streets.

Geography 
Novenkoye is located 39 km northwest of Gornyak (the district's administrative centre) by road. Novomikhaylovka is the nearest rural locality.

References 

Rural localities in Loktevsky District